Pleurifera is a small genus of sea snails in the family Columbellidae.

Species
 Pleurifera flammulata K. Monsecour & D. Monsecour, 2018
 Pleurifera fulgens K. Monsecour & D. Monsecour, 2016
 Pleurifera hawaiiensis K. Monsecour & D. Monsecour, 2019
 Pleurifera lepida K. Monsecour & D. Monsecour, 2016
 Pleurifera suzannae (Drivas & Jay, 1990)
 Pleurifera tenuilabris K. Monsecour & D. Monsecour, 2016

References

External links
  Drivas, J. & Jay, M. (1997). Report on a collection of Columbellidae (Mollusca, Gastopoda) from the west Indian Ocean region (Madagascar, Glorieuses Islands, Comores Islands, and nearby banks and coral shawls) with descriptions of three new species and one new genus. Apex. 12 (1): 31-42

Columbellidae